is a Japanese politician of the New Komeito Party, a member of the House of Councillors in the Diet (national legislature). A native of Kitakyūshū, Fukuoka and graduate of Chuo University, he was elected to the House of Representatives for the first time in 1993 after serving in the city assembly of Kitakyushu. In 1998, he was elected to the House of Councillors for the first time.

References

External links 
  in Japanese.

1944 births
Living people
Members of the House of Councillors (Japan)
People from Kitakyushu
New Komeito politicians
Japanese municipal councilors
Politicians from Fukuoka Prefecture